Andal Junction is a railway station on the Bardhaman–Asansol line. The Andal–Sainthia and Andal–Sitarampur branch lines both include colliery siding and start from Andal. The station is located in Paschim Bardhaman district in the Indian state of West Bengal. It serves Andal and the surrounding mining-industrial areas.

Electrification
The Waria–Asansol sector was electrified in 1960–61.

Facilities

Locomotive shed
Andal has a diesel locomotive shed. It houses WDS-6, WDM-2, WDM 3A, WDG-3A, WDG-4 and WDG-4D locomotives. The first WDM-2 manufactured by Banaras Locomotive Works is in Andal locomotive shed.

Marshalling yard
Andal Yard is one of the largest in the Eastern Railway section. Coal loaded at various colliery sidings is hauled to the yard by diesel locomotives. Coal is supplied in rakes to thermal power plants at Bakreshwar, Farrakka and Sagardighi. Substantial amounts of coal are dispatched to destinations on Northeast Frontier Railway as well.

References

External links

  Trains for Howrah
  Trains for Suri

Railway stations in Paschim Bardhaman district
Railway junction stations in West Bengal
Asansol railway division